Carausius is a genus of the tribe Lonchodini, in the order Phasmatodea (stick and leaf insects). The genus is in many ways typical of the Phasmatodea in that all species are twig-like in appearance. These species are parthenogenetic.

Carausius morosus is the most commonly kept stick insect in captivity.

Species
The  Phasmida Species File lists:

 Carausius abdominalis (Brunner von Wattenwyl, 1907)
 Carausius alluaudi (Bolívar [Y Urrutia], 1895)
 Carausius baumei Karny, 1910
 Carausius bicornis Ho, 2017 - Vietnam
 Carausius bolivari (Brunner von Wattenwyl, 1907)
 Carausius bracatus Rehn, 1904
 Carausius burri Brunner von Wattenwyl, 1907
 Carausius crawangensis (de Haan, 1842)
 Carausius cristatus Brunner von Wattenwyl, 1907
 Carausius debilis Brunner von Wattenwyl, 1907
 Carausius detractus Brunner von Wattenwyl, 1907
 Carausius emeiensis Chen & He, 2008
 Carausius erniwatiae Seow-Choen, 2020
 Carausius exsul Werner, 1930
 Carausius femoralis Chen & He, 2002
 Carausius fruhstorferi (Carl, 1913)
 Carausius furcillatus Pantel, 1917
 Carausius gardineri Bolívar [Y Urrutia], 1912
 Carausius gracilicercus Ho, 2021
 Carausius gracilicornis Ho, 2021
 Carausius granulatus Brunner von Wattenwyl, 1893
 Carausius guizhouensis Ho, 2021
 Carausius hilaris Brunner von Wattenwyl, 1907
 Carausius huanglianshanensis Ho, 2017
 Carausius imbellis Brunner von Wattenwyl, 1907
 Carausius insolens Brunner von Wattenwyl, 1907
 Carausius irregulariterlobatus Brunner von Wattenwyl, 1907
 Carausius juvenilis Brunner von Wattenwyl, 1907
 Carausius lijiangensis Chen & He, 2002
 Carausius lobulatipes Pantel, 1917
 Carausius luchunensis Ho, 2017
 Carausius mancus Brunner von Wattenwyl, 1907
 Carausius minutus Brunner von Wattenwyl, 1907
 Carausius morosus Brunner von Wattenwyl, 1907
 Carausius nodosus (de Haan, 1842)
 Carausius novus Ho, 2017
 Carausius patruclis Brunner von Wattenwyl, 1907
 Carausius primiglobosus Seow-Choen, 2021
 Carausius proximus Carl, 1913
 Carausius pustulosus Pantel, 1917
 Carausius rotundatolobatus Brunner von Wattenwyl, 1907
 Carausius rubrogranulatus Ho, 2021
 Carausius rudissimus Brunner von Wattenwyl, 1907
 Carausius rugosus Brunner von Wattenwyl, 1907 - Vietnam
 Carausius scotti Ferrière, 1912
 Carausius sechellensis (Bolívar [Y Urrutia], 1895)
 Carausius sikkimensis (Brunner von Wattenwyl, 1907)
 Carausius simplex Brunner von Wattenwyl, 1907
 Carausius spinosus Brunner von Wattenwyl, 1907
 Carausius strumosus Stål, 1875 - type species (Java)
 Carausius tanahrataensis Seow-Choen, 2000
 Carausius tetsengi Seow-Choen, 2021
 Carausius theiseni Cappe de Baillon, Favrelle & Vichêt, 1934
 Carausius transiliens Brunner von Wattenwyl, 1907
 Carausius undatus Chen & He, 2002
 Carausius vacillans Brunner von Wattenwyl, 1907
 Carausius virgo Brunner von Wattenwyl, 1907
 Carausius yingjiangensis Ho, 2017
 Carausius yunnanensis Ho, 2017

Note: possibly nomen nudum:
 Carausius siamensis Thanasinchayakul, 2006
 Carausius thailandi Thanasinchayakul, 2006

References

External links
Phasmid Study Group: Carausius

Phasmatodea genera
Lonchodidae
Phasmatodea of Asia